Interdental cleaning or interproximal cleaning is part of oral hygiene where the aim is to clean the areas in between the teeth, otherwise known as the proximal surfaces of teeth. This is to remove the dental plaque in areas a toothbrush cannot reach. The ultimate goal of interproximal cleaning is to prevent the development of interproximal caries and periodontal disease. The combined use of tooth brushing, and mechanical and manual interdental cleaning devices has been proven to reduce the prevalence of caries and periodontal diseases.

Floss 

Floss is one of the most commonly used interdental cleaners. It is traditionally made of waxed nylon wrapped up in a plastic box. Since dental floss is able to remove some inter-proximal plaque, frequent regular dental flossing will reduce inter-proximal caries and periodontal disease risks. Results of a high level of evidence meta-analysis recently found that floss may not be the most effective method for interdental cleaning, contrary to common belief at the time. Especially for individuals lacking dexterity or compliance, waterjet irrigators and interdental brushes were found to be significantly more effective than flossing.

Interdental brush 

Interdental brushes commonly consist of a central metal wire core with soft nylon filaments twisted around and are available in various sizes to correspond to different spaces between teeth. Certain factors such as material, geometry and size of the brush can be chosen to optimize the efficiency and effectiveness:

 Material: metal wire may be sensitive to certain patients thereby rubber might be preferred. 
 Geometry: Straight interdental brushes are considered more effective compared to angled  interproximal plaque removal. 
 Size:  This varies depending on the space between individual teeth. Failure to use an appropriate size may account for the lack of efficiency of interdental cleaning aid.

Oral irrigator 

Oral Irrigators (also called water flossers) are common mechanical tools used for interdental cleaning. It uses a combination of pulsation and pressure facilitated by water or air to remove debris and bacteria both above and below the gums. When used with tooth brushing, the use of oral irrigators reduces inflammation of the gums (gingivitis) by removing loosely adherent plaque. It is also beneficial for implant maintenance as there is less bleeding around implants when oral irrigators are used compared to dental floss.

Toothpick 

Toothpicks are thin sticks made from various materials that insert into interdental space for cleaning. Although there is a long history of use dating back to 1.8 million years ago, dentists generally recommend against their use due to a perceived danger of causing mechanical damage to gum, enamel, and tooth roots.

References 

Oral hygiene